Armi Laila Hosia (28 June 1909 – 9 July 1992; née Kurkinen) was a Finnish politician. She served as Minister of Education from 13 April 1962 to 18 December 1963. Hosia was born in Joensuu, and was a Member of the Parliament of Finland, representing the People's Party of Finland from 1954 to 1965 and the Liberal People's Party from 1965 to 1966.

References

1909 births
1992 deaths
People from Joensuu
People from Kuopio Province (Grand Duchy of Finland)
People's Party of Finland (1951) politicians
Liberals (Finland) politicians
Ministers of Education of Finland
Members of the Parliament of Finland (1954–58)
Members of the Parliament of Finland (1958–62)
Members of the Parliament of Finland (1962–66)
University of Helsinki alumni
Women government ministers of Finland